Strikeforce: Shamrock vs. Baroni was a mixed martial arts event co-promoted by Strikeforce and EliteXC. The event took place on Friday, June 22, 2007 at the HP Pavilion in San Jose, California.  The main card aired on pay-per-view, with the undercard streamed live on ProElite.com. The PPV event was rebroadcast on the Showtime premium cable channel on June 30, 2007.

Results

Purses

Notable fighter payouts included:

Controversy
 Frank Shamrock was criticized for pushing an unconscious Phil Baroni off him using his leg rather than allowing the referee to pull Phil off Frank. In a post-fight interview question regarding the incident, Shamrock stated that "[Phil] was heavy on top of me... he was squishing the life out of me... he was laying on my leg and on my chest... that's it. And I thought it looked better on camera.".
 Fighter Carter Williams was found by the CSAC to have tested positive for cocaine. He was fined $1,000 and suspended through Dec 19, 2007.
 Fighter Phil Baroni tested positive for Boldenone and Stanozolol steroid Metabolites according to the California State Athletic Commission (CSAC).  He was fined $2,500 and suspended for a year in the state of California. Baroni denied taking any banned substances, and appealed the decision. On October 31, 2007 Baroni's suspension was reduced to 6 months.

See also
 Strikeforce
 List of Strikeforce champions
 List of Strikeforce events
 2007 in Strikeforce

References

External links
Strikeforce Official website
Official EliteXC website

Elite Xtreme Combat events
Events in San Jose, California
Shamrock vs. Baroni
2007 in mixed martial arts
Mixed martial arts in San Jose, California
2007 in sports in California